John Rigge was an Oxford college head in the 16th-century.

Rigge was  educated at Exeter College, Oxford; and was Rector of Exeter College, Oxford, from 1515 to 1516. He held livings at St Michael, Honiton and St Thomas, Exeter. He died in 1537.

References

Alumni of Exeter College, Oxford
Rectors of Exeter College, Oxford
16th-century English people
1537 deaths